Spencer Darren Butterfield (born October 11, 1992) is an American professional basketball player for Telenet Giants Antwerp of the BNXT League. In 2017 he won the FIBA Europe Cup Championship with Nanterre 92.

Professional career
On March 14, 2017, Butterfield set a new FIBA Europe Cup record when he scored 11 three-point field goals in a 110–82 win against Usak Sportif. He also tied the scoring record by scoring 39 points. In April, he won the FIBA Europe Cup title after beating Élan Chalon in the Finals. On Tuesday July 25, 2017, ALBA Berlin announced that it had signed Butterfield to a one-year contract.

On July 27, 2018, Butterfield signed a two-year deal with the Italian club Pallacanestro Reggiana.

For the 2019–20 season, Butterfield re-signed with Nanterre 92. He averaged 10.6 points, 3.6 rebounds and 1.6 assists per game. On October 8, 2020, Butterfield signed with Iberostar Tenerife of the Liga ACB.

On November 5, 2022, he signed with Telenet Giants Antwerp of the Belgian BNXT League. On 12 March 2023, Butterfield and the Giants won the Belgian Cup after beating BC Oostende in the final. He scored a shared team-high 18 points in the final and was named the Belgian Cup Final MVP after the game.

References

External links
Utah State Aggies bio

1992 births
Living people
American expatriate basketball people in France
American expatriate basketball people in Italy
American expatriate basketball people in Lithuania
American expatriate basketball people in Spain
American men's basketball players
Antwerp Giants players
Basketball players from Utah
BC Juventus players
CB Canarias players
Junior college men's basketball players in the United States
Lega Basket Serie A players
Liga ACB players
Melilla Baloncesto players
Nanterre 92 players
Pallacanestro Reggiana players
Shooting guards
Sportspeople from Provo, Utah
Utah State Aggies men's basketball players